Rogów  is a village in Gmina Gorzyce, Wodzisław County, Silesian Voivodeship, Poland. As at 2006 it had a population of 2,905.

External links 
  Official website of the village
  Information about village at Gmina Gorzyce website

Villages in Wodzisław County